State Route 230 (SR 230) is a secondary state highway located in Humphreys County and Hickman County in Middle Tennessee.  It consists largely of former county highways that were designated as a state route in order to ensure adequate ongoing maintenance funding.

Route description 
SR 230 runs from its western terminus at SR 13 in Humphreys County south of Waverly roughly southeast to the rural community of Bold Spring.  This portion of the highway is known as Bold Spring Road.  From Bold Spring, the highway runs roughly south until it enters Hickman County; it crosses I-40 shortly thereafter.  From this point it trends largely east, passing through the rural community of Spot and the former Hickman County seat, Vernon.  Meeting SR 48 at the community of Nunnelly, it is overlain by 48 until the junction with SR 100 junction in eastern Centerville.  From there it is overlain by SR 100 until just west of Lyles where it splits from SR 100, again running south and through the small community of Littlelot.  This portion of the highway is known as Littlelot Road.  Just south of Littlelot is the eastern terminus along SR 50.

Major intersections

See also
List of Tennessee state highways

References

230